The A. C. Gilbert Company  was an American toy company, once one of the largest in the world.  Gilbert originated the Erector Set, which is a construction toy similar to Meccano in the rest of the world, and made chemistry sets, microscope kits, and a line of inexpensive reflector telescopes. In 1938, Gilbert purchased the American Flyer, a manufacturer of toy trains.  The Gilbert Company struggled after the death of its founder in 1961 and went out of business in 1967. Its trademarks and toy lines were sold to other companies.

History
First known as the Mysto Manufacturing Company, the company was founded in 1909 in Westville, Connecticut, by Alfred Carlton Gilbert, a magician, and his friend John Petrie, to provide supplies for magic shows. Their "Mysto Magic" magician's sets were marketed from the 1910s until the 1950s. The sets contained a variety of objects including interlocking rings, playing cards, and a magic wand.

In 1911, Gilbert invented the Erector construction toy concept, inspired by railroad girders used by the New York, New Haven and Hartford Railroad in its mainline electrification project. Gilbert and his wife Mary developed cardboard prototypes to get the right sizes, openings, and angles to create a robust buildable girder pattern. The Erector set was introduced in 1911, as the Mysto Erector Structural Steel Builder, at the New York City Toy Fair.

In 1916, the name of the company was changed from the Mysto Manufacturing Company to the A. C. Gilbert Company.

In 1920, the company began selling regenerative vacuum tube radio receivers designed by the C. D. Tuska Company, and the following year, in order to increase interest in radio, began operating station WCJ, which was the first broadcasting station licensed in the state of Connecticut. However, the receiver sales were ended after the Westinghouse Electric & Manufacturing Company threatened legal action, on the grounds that Tuska's patent rights did not extend to other companies, and WCJ was shut down in late 1922.

Beginning in 1922, A. C. Gilbert made chemistry sets in various sizes. The instruction manuals were co-edited by a Sterling Professor at Yale university and one of his graduate students.

Between 1946 and 1966, the company manufactured toy trains called the American Flyer.

In the 1950s, sets for other budding scientists included those to investigate radioactivity using a kit featuring a Geiger counter and radioactive samples.

A line of inexpensive reflector telescopes followed the Sputnik-inspired science craze in the late 1950s. In 1958, the company promoted its science toys by commissioning a comic book, Adventures in Science, from Custom Comics. In the comic, a mysterious "Mr. Science" leaps through time and space with a bored teenage boy to interest him in science.

In 1965, A. C. Gilbert produced James Bond movie tie-in figures and a slot car road race set featuring Bond's Aston Martin DB5.

References

External links 
 The Eli Whitney Museum's extensive A. C. Gilbert Project includes collections, a bibliography, and pictures of Gilbert
 The Gilbert Electric Eye Set with Free Downloadable Manual
 Slideshow: Golden Age of Chemistry Sets
 Soaring and gliding aircraft This patent was assigned to A.C. Gilbert company. 
 A less successful venture of the company
 "The 8 Most Wildly Irresponsible Vintage Toys" -- page 1 and page 2 at Cracked.com: Includes humorous discussions of some of A.C. Gilbert's more ill-advised products for pre-teens:  A glass blowing kit (#8); a molten lead casting kit (#7); a chemistry set (#3) which included potassium permanganate, ammonium nitrate and instructions on how to make explosives; and an atomic energy lab (#1) which included uranium and radium samples and a coupon for ordering replacement uranium and radium through the mail.

Further reading
 

Model railroad manufacturers
Toy train manufacturers
Toy companies of the United States
Defunct toy manufacturers
Companies based in New Haven County, Connecticut
Manufacturing companies established in 1909
Manufacturing companies disestablished in 1967
1909 establishments in Connecticut
1967 disestablishments in Connecticut
Model manufacturers of the United States
Defunct manufacturing companies based in Connecticut